Joseph Lawrence Sax (February 3, 1936 – March 9, 2014) was an environmental law professor, known for developing the public trust doctrine.

Born and raised in Chicago, Sax graduated from Harvard University in 1957 and then earned a J.D. degree in 1959 from the University of Chicago Law School.  After a few years in private practice and at the Department of Justice he began teaching, first with the University of Colorado in 1962 and then at the University of Michigan in 1965.  He joined the University of California, Berkeley School of Law in 1986.

From 1994 to 1996, Sax worked with the Clinton Administration under Interior Secretary Bruce Babbitt.

Sax was involved in environmental and conservation law from early in his career, working with the Sierra Club in Colorado. drafting Michigan's environmental law (known as the "Sax Act") and working on a variety of water resource cases in California.

It was while he was teaching law students at the University of Colorado that he realized that there was no satisfactory theory accounting for the public interest in natural resources law, and that his work was "grooming lawyers who might one day help companies extract resources, mainly from public lands."

Works
 Books
 Playing Darts With a Rembrandt: Public and Private Rights to Cultural Treasures (1999)
 Mountains Without Handrails
 Water Law--Planning and Policy
 Water Law--Cases and Commentary
 Defending the Environment

 Scholarly articles
 "The Public Trust Doctrine in Natural Resource Law: Effective Judicial Intervention", 68 Michigan Law Review 471 (1970)

Awards 
 Blue Planet Prize - 2007, from the Asahi Glass Foundation ("likened to a Nobel for environmental science")
 American Academy of Arts and Sciences, fellow
 Distinguished Faculty Achievement Award, University of Michigan
 Elizabeth Haub Environmental Prize of the Free University of Brussels
 Audubon Society's Conservationist of the Year Award
 William O. Douglas Legal Achievement Award from the Sierra Club
 Environmental Quality Award of the U.S. Environmental Protection Agency

Notes

1936 births
2014 deaths
American legal scholars
Environmental law
Harvard University alumni
University of Chicago Law School alumni
University of Colorado faculty
University of Michigan faculty
UC Berkeley School of Law faculty
Lawyers from Chicago
20th-century American lawyers